The 1977 Detroit Tigers finished in fourth place in the American League East with a record of 74–88, 26 games behind the New York Yankees. They were outscored by their opponents 751 to 714. The Tigers drew 1,359,856 fans to Tiger Stadium in 1977, ranking 7th of the 14 teams in the American League.

Offseason 
 February 23, 1977: Tito Fuentes was signed as a free agent by the Tigers.

Regular season 
With 212 hits, 100 runs scored, and a .325 batting average, center fielder Ron LeFlore was the team's most valuable player, and the recipient of the "Tiger of the Year" award. First baseman Jason Thompson led the team with 31 home runs and 105 RBIs, and second baseman Tito Fuentes was the team's only other .300 hitter, with a .309 batting average and 190 hits. Designated hitter Rusty Staub also had a .278 batting average, 173 hits, 22 home runs, and 101 RBIs. Rookie Steve Kemp (the first pick in the 1976 amateur draft) hit .257 with 18 home runs and 88 RBIs.

The rookie sensation of 1976, Mark Fidrych pitched in 1977 (2.89 ERA), but tendinitis limited "The Bird" to 11 games. The pitching star of 1977 for Detroit was rookie Dave Rozema who went 15–7 with a 3.09 ERA and finished eighth in the American League Cy Young Award voting.

1977 also saw the debut of Steve Kemp (debut April 7, 1977), Dave Rozema (debut April 11, 1977), Jack Morris (debut July 26, 1977), Lance Parrish (debut September 5, 1977), Alan Trammell (debut September 9, 1977), and Lou Whitaker (debut September 9, 1977).

Season standings

Record vs. opponents

Notable transactions 
 April 12, 1977: Willie Horton was traded by the Tigers to the Texas Rangers for Steve Foucault.

Roster

Player stats

Batting

Starters by position 
Note: Pos = Position; G = Games played; AB = At bats; H = Hits; Avg. = Batting average; HR = Home runs; RBI = Runs batted in

Other batters 
Note: G = Games played; AB = At bats; H = Hits; Avg. = Batting average; HR = Home runs; RBI = Runs batted in

Pitching

Starting pitchers 
Note: G = Games; IP = Innings pitched; W = Wins; L = Losses; ERA = Earned run average; SO = Strikeouts

Other pitchers 
Note: G = Games pitched; IP = Innings pitched; W = Wins; L = Losses; ERA = Earned run average; SO = Strikeouts

Relief pitchers 
Note: G = Games pitched; W = Wins; L = Losses; SV = Saves; GF = Games finished; ERA = Earned run average; SO = Strikeouts

Awards and honors

Award winners 
Ron LeFlore
 Tiger of the Year Award from the Detroit baseball writers
 Finished 20th in AL MVP voting

Dave Rozema
 Finished 8th in the AL Cy Young Award voting

Jason Thompson
 Finished 21st in AL MVP voting

All-Stars 
Jason Thompson, reserve

League top ten finishers 
Fernando Arroyo
 #4 in AL in losses (18)

Mark Fidrych
 AL All Star Team, pitcher

Tito Fuentes
 AL leader in innings played at second base (1327)
 AL leader in putouts at second base (379)
 AL leader in double plays at second base (115)
 AL leader in errors at second base (26)
 AL leader in complete games at second base (144)
 #2 in AL in singles (156)
 #8 in AL in hits (190)
 #8 in AL in triples (10)
 #9 in AL in sacrifice hits (13)

Steve Kemp
 AL leader in games in left field (148)
 AL leader in complete games in left field (146)
 AL leader in innings played in left field (1316)

Ron LeFlore
 AL leader in assists by a center fielder (12)
 #2 in AL in hits (212)
 #2 in AL in singles (156)
 #2 in AL in at bats (652)
 #2 in AL in singles (156)
 #2 in AL in times caught stealing (19)
 #4 in AL in plate appearances (698)
 #4 in AL in strikeouts (121) (tied with Tito Fuentes)
 #5 in AL in batting average (.325)
 #5 in AL in stolen bases (39)
 #5 in AL in total bases (310)
 #6 in AL in Power/Speed Number (22.7)
 #8 in AL in triples (10)
 #8 in AL in times on base (253)
 #9 in AL in runs scored (100)
 #9 in AL in outs (475)
 #10 in AL in runs created (110)

Dave Rozema
 AL leader in bases on balls per 9 innings pitched (1.40)
 #5 in AL in Adjusted ERA+ (138)
 #6 in AL in strikeout to walk ratio (2.71)
 #7 in AL in ERA (3.09)
 #8 in AL in complete games (16)
 #9 in AL in win percentage (.682)

Rusty Staub
 #1 in AL in times grounded into double plays (27)
 #2 in AL in outs (490)
 #3 in AL in sacrifice flies (10)
 #5 in AL in plate appearances (695)
 #7 in AL in at bats per strikeout (13.3)
 #8 in AL in doubles (34)

Jason Thompson
 #6 in AL in home runs (31)
 #6 in AL in sacrifice flies (9)
 #8 in AL in RBIs (105)

Alan Trammell
 Youngest player in the AL (19)

Players ranking among top 100 all time at position 
The following members of the 1977 Detroit Tigers are among the Top 100 of all time at their position, as ranked by The Bill James Historical Baseball Abstract in 2001:
 Lance Parrish: 19th best catcher of all time (played 12 games as a rookie)
 Lou Whitaker: 13th best second baseman of all time (played 11 games as a rookie)
 Alan Trammell: 9th best shortstop of all time (played 19 games as a rookie)
 Aurelio Rodríguez: 91st best third baseman of all time
 Ron LeFlore: 80th best center fielder of all time
 Ben Oglivie: 64th best left fielder of all time
 Willie Horton: 55th best left fielder of all time (played one game for 1977 Tigers)

Farm system 

LEAGUE CHAMPIONS: Montgomery, Lakeland, Bristol

References

External links 

 1977 Detroit Tigers Regular Season Statistics at Baseball Reference

Detroit Tigers seasons
Detroit Tigers season
Detroit Tiger
1977 in Detroit